David Ashby (born: 22 July 1938) is a New Zealand-born sailor from Fiji, who represented his country at the 1988 Summer Olympics in Busan, South Korea as helmsman in the Soling. With crew members Colin Dunlop and Colin Philp, Sr. they took the 19th place.

References

External links

Living people
1938 births
New Zealand emigrants to Fiji
Sailors at the 1984 Summer Olympics – Finn
Sailors at the 1988 Summer Olympics – Soling
Olympic sailors of Fiji
New Zealand male sailors (sport)
Fijian male sailors (sport)